Markus Karlsson may refer to: 
===Markus===
 Markus Karlsson (footballer, born 1972), Swedish football (soccer) player for Djurgården
 Markus Karlsson (footballer, born 1979), Swedish football (soccer) player for Degerfors and AIK
 Markus Karlsson (footballer, born 2004), Swedish football (soccer) player for Hammarby
 Markus Karlsson (ice hockey) (born 1988), Swedish ice hockey defenceman
 Markus Karlsson (presenter), presenter with France 24